Dorno is a comune (municipality) in the Province of Pavia in the Italian region Lombardy, located about  southwest of Milan and about  west of Pavia.

Dorno borders the following municipalities: Alagna, Garlasco, Gropello Cairoli, Pieve Albignola, Sannazzaro de' Burgondi, Scaldasole, Valeggio, Zinasco.

Demographic evolution

Notable people

Artist Marco Lodola (1955-).
Ron (singer) (1953-)

References 

Cities and towns in Lombardy